Nanhai Boulevard is a major north-south thoroughfare in Nanshan District, Shenzhen, China. It runs from the southern tip of Nantou Peninsula near Shekou Passenger Terminal north to the junction of Guangshen Expressway, where it becomes Tongle Road which extends into Nanping Expressway. It spans about 8 kilometers in length. It was formed by merging Nanyou Boulevard, Gongye Boulevard and Qilin Road in 2004.

Major junctions
Wanghai Road
Dongbin Road
Binhai Boulevard (flyover)
Shennan Road (flyover)
Beihuan Boulevard (flyover)
Guangshen Expressway

Notable sites along the road
Shenzhen University
Lixiang Park
Shekou Passenger Terminal 
Nanhai Hotel
 Shekou Walmart 
 Shekou Internet Valley
 Times Plaza

References

Roads in Shenzhen
Nanshan District, Shenzhen